The International Requirements Engineering Conference (RE), is one of the largest annual software engineering conferences. It has an 'A' rating from the Australian Ranking of ICT Conferences and an 'A1' rating from the Brazilian ministry of education.

The RE conference originally started as two alternating biennial conferences. 
 The first of these was the International Symposium on Requirements Engineering (RE), starting in 1993. 
 The second was the International Conference on Requirements Engineering (ICRE), starting in 1994. In 2002, these two conference series merged under the name Joint International Requirements Engineering Conference (RE'02).  
Also starting in 2002, the conference venue began rotating between three general locations: Europe, North America, and a non-European, non-North American location.  Since 2003, the conference series has been known as the International Requirements Engineering Conference.

List of Conferences
Past and future RE conferences include:

Most Influential Paper Award

Beginning with the 11th RE in 2003, an award was given for the paper deemed to be the most influential paper published from the conference held 10 years earlier.  The judging for this award is done by the program committee for the current conference.  If more than one award is given, the papers receiving the awards are categorized.

References

Software engineering conferences